Maria Seifert (born 15 May 1991) is a Paralympian athlete from Germany competing mainly in category T37 sprint events.

She competed in the 2008 Summer Paralympics in Beijing, China, where she won a bronze medal in the women's 100 metres - T37 event and a bronze medal in the women's 200 metres - T37 event.

External links
 
 
 

1991 births
Living people
Paralympic athletes of Germany
Paralympic bronze medalists for Germany
Paralympic medalists in athletics (track and field)
Athletes (track and field) at the 2008 Summer Paralympics
Athletes (track and field) at the 2012 Summer Paralympics
Athletes (track and field) at the 2016 Summer Paralympics
Medalists at the 2008 Summer Paralympics
Medalists at the 2012 Summer Paralympics
Medalists at the World Para Athletics Championships
Medalists at the World Para Athletics European Championships